Woodlawn is a historic home located at St. Mary's City, St. Mary's County, Maryland, United States. It is a Federal-style, two-story, five-bay frame house with brick ends, which is two rooms deep and has a gable roof. Each brick end contains a large double exterior chimney. The house is a large and fully developed Federal period house exhibiting one of the most important characteristics of Southern Maryland's 18th-century architecture: brick ends with frame facades.  It is now operated as a bed and breakfast.

Woodlawn was listed on the National Register of Historic Places in 1980.

References

External links
, including undated photo, at Maryland Historical Trust
Woodlawn: A Maryland Estate and Bed and Breakfast

Houses on the National Register of Historic Places in Maryland
Houses in St. Mary's County, Maryland
Federal architecture in Maryland
Bed and breakfasts in Maryland
National Register of Historic Places in St. Mary's County, Maryland